Josip Ćutuk (born 4 May 1985) is a Bosnian-Herzegovinian footballer who most recently played as a defender for RWB Adria.

External links
 Profile 

1985 births
Living people
People from Grude
Croats of Bosnia and Herzegovina
Association football central defenders
Bosnia and Herzegovina footballers
NK Brotnjo players
HNK Hajduk Split players
NK Žepče players
NK Kamen Ingrad players
NK Imotski players
Újpest FC players
NK Široki Brijeg players
FK Željezničar Sarajevo players
HNK Zmaj Makarska players
Premier League of Bosnia and Herzegovina players
Croatian Football League players
Nemzeti Bajnokság I players
Second Football League (Croatia) players
United Premier Soccer League players
Bosnia and Herzegovina expatriate footballers
Expatriate footballers in Croatia
Bosnia and Herzegovina expatriate sportspeople in Croatia
Expatriate footballers in Hungary
Bosnia and Herzegovina expatriate sportspeople in Hungary
Expatriate soccer players in the United States
Bosnia and Herzegovina expatriate sportspeople in the United States